Input-to-state stability (ISS) is a stability notion widely used to study stability of nonlinear control systems with external inputs. Roughly speaking, a control system is ISS if it is globally asymptotically stable in the absence of external inputs and if its trajectories are bounded by a function of the size of the input for all sufficiently large times.
The importance of ISS is due to the fact that the concept has bridged the gap between input–output and state-space methods, widely used within the control systems community.

ISS unified the Lyapunov and input-output stability theories and revolutionized our view on stabilization of nonlinear systems, design of robust nonlinear observers, stability of nonlinear interconnected control systems, nonlinear detectability theory, and supervisory adaptive control. 
This made ISS the dominating stability paradigm in nonlinear control theory, with such diverse applications as robotics, mechatronics, systems biology, electrical and aerospace engineering, to name a few. 

The notion of ISS was introduced for systems described by ordinary differential equations by Eduardo Sontag in 1989.

Since that the concept was successfully used for many other classes of control systems including systems governed by partial differential equations, retarded systems, hybrid systems, etc.

Definition 

Consider a time-invariant system of ordinary differential equations of the form

This ensures that there exists a unique absolutely continuous solution of the system.

To define ISS and related properties, we exploit the following classes of comparison functions.

System is called globally asymptotically stable at zero (0-GAS) if the corresponding system with zero input

is globally asymptotically stable, that is there exist 
 so that for all initial values 
 and all times  the following estimate is valid for solutions of 

System is called input-to-state stable (ISS) if there exist functions 
 and   so that for all initial values , all admissible inputs  and all times  the following inequality holds

The function   in the above inequality is called the gain.

Clearly, an ISS system is 0-GAS as well as BIBO stable (if we put the output equal to the state of the system). The converse implication is in general not true.

It can be also proved that if , then .

Characterizations of input-to-state stability property 

For an understanding of ISS its restatements in terms of other stability properties are of great importance.

System is called globally stable (GS) if there exist  
 such that ,  and  it holds that

System satisfies the asymptotic gain (AG) property if there exists  
: ,  it holds that

The following statements are equivalent for sufficiently regular right-hand side 

1. is ISS

2. is GS and has the AG property

3. is 0-GAS and has the AG property

The proof of this result as well as many other characterizations of ISS can be found in the papers
 and

ISS-Lyapunov functions 

An important tool for the verification of ISS are ISS-Lyapunov functions.

 
and 
 it holds:
 

The function  is called Lyapunov gain.

If a system is without inputs (i.e. ), then the last implication reduces to the condition

which tells us that   is a "classic" Lyapunov function.

An important result due to E. Sontag and Y. Wang is that a system is ISS if and only if there exists a smooth ISS-Lyapunov function for it.

Examples 

Consider a system

Define a candidate ISS-Lyapunov function  by

Choose a Lyapunov gain  by 
.

Then we obtain that for   it holds

This shows that   is an ISS-Lyapunov function for a considered system with the Lyapunov gain  .

Interconnections of ISS systems 

One of the main features of the ISS framework is the possibility to study stability properties of interconnections of input-to-state stable systems.

Consider the system given by

For the -th subsystem of  the definition of an ISS-Lyapunov function can be written as follows.

A smooth function  is an ISS-Lyapunov function (ISS-LF)

 
and  it holds

Cascade interconnections 

Cascade interconnections are a special type of interconnection, where the dynamics of the -th subsystem does not depend on the states of the subsystems . Formally, the cascade interconnection can be written as

If all subsystems of the above system are ISS, then the whole cascade interconnection is also ISS.

In contrast to cascades of ISS systems, the cascade interconnection of 0-GAS systems is in general not 0-GAS. The following example illustrates this fact. Consider a system given by

Feedback interconnections 

The interconnection structure of subsystems is characterized by the internal Lyapunov gains . The question, whether the interconnection is ISS, depends on the properties of the gain operator  defined by 

The following small-gain theorem establishes a sufficient condition for ISS of the interconnection of ISS systems. If the nonlinear small-gain condition

holds, then the whole interconnection is ISS.

The small-gain condition in this form is called also cyclic small-gain condition.

Related stability concepts

Integral ISS (iISS) 

System is called integral input-to-state stable (ISS) if there exist functions  and   so that for all initial values , all admissible inputs  and all times  the following inequality holds

In contrast to ISS systems, if a system is integral ISS, its trajectories may be unbounded even for bounded inputs. To see this put  for all  and take . Then the estimate takes the form

As in the ISS framework, Lyapunov methods play a central role in iISS theory.

 
and 
 it holds:
 

An important result due to D. Angeli, E. Sontag and Y. Wang is that system is integral ISS if and only if there exists an iISS-Lyapunov function for it.

Note that in the formula above  is assumed to be only positive definite. 

This shows in particular, that every ISS system is integral ISS. The converse implication is not true, as the following example shows. Consider the system

This system is not ISS, since for large enough inputs the trajectories are unbounded. However, it is integral ISS with an iISS-Lyapunov function  defined by

Local ISS (LISS) 

An important role are also played by local versions of the ISS property. A system is called locally ISS (LISS) if there exist a constant  and functions

 and   so that for all , all admissible inputs  and all times  it holds that

An interesting observation is that 0-GAS implies LISS.

Other stability notions 

Many other related to ISS stability notions have been introduced: incremental ISS, input-to-state dynamical stability (ISDS), input-to-state practical stability (ISpS), input-to-output stability (IOS) etc.

ISS of time-delay systems 

Consider the time-invariant time-delay system

Here  is the state of the system at time ,  and  satisfies certain assumptions to guarantee existence and uniqueness of solutions of the system.

System is ISS if and only if there exist functions  and  such that for every , every admissible input  and for all , it holds that

In the ISS theory for time-delay systems two different Lyapunov-type sufficient conditions have been proposed: via ISS Lyapunov-Razumikhin functions and by ISS Lyapunov-Krasovskii functionals. For converse Lyapunov theorems for time-delay systems see.

ISS of other classes of systems 

Input-to-state stability of the systems based on time-invariant ordinary differential equations is a quite developed theory. However, ISS theory of other classes of systems is also being investigated for time-variant ODE systems and hybrid systems. In the last time also certain generalizations of ISS concepts to infinite-dimensional systems have been proposed.

References 

Nonlinear control